Topolewski v. State, 130 Wis. 244, 109 N.W. 1037 (Wis. 1906), is a United States criminal case involving the trespass element in a staged larceny. Topolewki asked an employee of a company to place its product (barrels of meat) on the loading dock for Topolewski to pick up without paying. The company was made aware of Topolowski's scheme and the barrels were placed on the dock, which were then picked up by Topolewski without interference by anyone at the company who observed Topoloswky taking the barrels. The higher court overturned Topolweski's conviction because trespass was an element of larceny at that time, and the company had effectively delivered possession of the barrels to Topolweski by placement on the dock where such barrels are normally picked up by customers, and because he obtained possession by means of this form of delivery.

References

1906 in United States case law
U.S. state criminal case law
Legal history of Wisconsin
Wisconsin state case law